Charles (Chuck) Frederick Burger (November 15, 1936 - March 25, 2021) was an American bridge player. Burger was from West Bloomfield, Michigan, and was an attorney.

Bridge accomplishments
Burger was an 11-time national bridge champion and elected to the American Contract Bridge League Hall of Fame in 2020 as a recipient of the Von Zedtwitz Award.

Awards
 ACBL Hall of Fame 2020 
 Herman Trophy (1) 1970

Wins

 North American Bridge Championships (11)
 Blue Ribbon Pairs (1) 1970 
 Nail Life Master Open Pairs (1) 1969 
 Grand National Teams (1) 2005 
 Jacoby Open Swiss Teams (1) 1996 
 Mitchell Board-a-Match Teams (2) 1969, 1988 
 Reisinger (2) 1988, 1992 
 Spingold (3) 1985, 1989, 1990

Runners-up

 North American Bridge Championships
 von Zedtwitz Life Master Pairs (2) 1969, 1973 
 Nail Life Master Open Pairs (1) 2000 
 Grand National Teams (3) 1974, 1982, 1996 
 Vanderbilt (3) 1971, 1997, 1998 
 Senior Knockout Teams (1) 2000 
 Mitchell Board-a-Match Teams (2) 1989, 1995 
 Chicago Mixed Board-a-Match (1) 1996 
 Reisinger (4) 1981, 1993, 1994, 1996 
 Spingold (2) 1994, 1997

Notes

External links
 

1936 births
2021 deaths
American contract bridge players
Place of birth missing
American lawyers
People from West Bloomfield, Michigan